The following is a list of stadiums used by the Gaelic Athletic Association (GAA). The stadiums are ordered by capacity; that is, the maximum number of spectators each stadium is authorised by the GAA to accommodate.

Three of the stadiums above 35,000 capacity are used for Gaelic football and hurling provincial finals, while the largest stadium, Croke Park, is used for the All-Ireland Senior Championship Finals during September of each year, and the semi- and quarter-finals of each sport. It is also used on occasion for the Leinster provincial finals and Ulster provincial finals in Gaelic football, and has been leased for non-GAA events.

While Croke Park has hosted the majority of finals of the All-Ireland Senior Football Championship, the final was previously passed among counties apart from Dublin—and, in the case of the 1947 All-Ireland Senior Football Championship Final, was played at the Polo Grounds in New York City. Similarly, Croke Park has hosted most of the finals of the All-Ireland Senior Hurling Championship; the most recent final held outside the capital was in 1984, at Semple Stadium in Thurles, County Tipperary, to mark the centenary of the founding of the GAA in the town.

Fans are not usually segregated at GAA venues.

County Grounds
Below are the locations of the county stadiums for senior county teams that participate in either the National Hurling League or the National Football League.

List of GAA Grounds
Below is a list of GAA stadiums ranked by capacity, from highest to lowest.

†Closed and in state of dereliction. Awaiting redevelopment. Listed capacity is for proposed redevelopment.

See also

 Sport in Ireland
 Féile na nGael

Lists of stadiums by capacity
 List
 In Ireland
 In Britain
 In England
 In Wales
 In Europe

References

Stadiums
 
GAA stadiums
GAA stadiums